Eoghan Grace (born 6 October 1987) is an Irish former rugby union player.

Career
Grace began his professional rugby career as a member of his native province Munster's academy, and during that time he won a grand slam with the Ireland under-20s team during the 2007 Six Nations Under 20s Championship and an All-Ireland League Division 1 title with Shannon in 2008–09. However, Grace was unable to break into Munster's senior squad, and he moved to England to join Premiership Rugby side Exeter Chiefs ahead of the 2010–11 season. Grace's time with the Devon club was hampered by an achilles injury, and after one season with Exeter, Grace returned to Ireland to join Connacht. He stayed with the western province for two seasons, which were also hampered by injury, before returning to Devon to join Plymouth Albion, where he lodged with fellow former Munsterman Declan Cusack.

After two seasons with Plymouth, Grace joined another RFU Championship side, Ealing Trailfinders, for the 2015–16 season. At the beginning of the 2016–17 season, Grace signed for Coventry and was appointed co-captain of the club, before ending his career back with Plymouth, whilst also coaching in the club's academy and community programme. After rugby, Grace began running two companies; Eolas+, a not-for-profit that goes into primary schools and runs holiday camps in the south-west of England to get children involved in sports, and Pro Rugby Academy, which works with aspiring rugby players who have missed out on contracts with professional clubs.

References

External links
Munster A Profile

Living people
1987 births
People educated at Rockwell College
Rugby union players from County Tipperary
Shannon RFC players
Exeter Chiefs players
Connacht Rugby players
Plymouth Albion R.F.C. players
Ealing Trailfinders Rugby Club players
Coventry R.F.C. players
Rugby union flankers